Batad, officially the Municipality of Batad,  is a 5th class municipality in the province of Iloilo, Philippines. According to the 2020 census, it has a population of 22,157 people.

In 1950, the barrio of Zarragoza was transferred to the town of Balasan.

Geography

Barangays

Batad is politically subdivided into 24 barangays.

Climate

Demographics

Economy

References

External links
 [ Philippine Standard Geographic Code]
 Philippine Census Information
 Local Governance Performance Management System

Municipalities of Iloilo